Donald Francis Dale (8 December 1944 – 13 February 1990) was an Australian politician. He was the Country Liberal Party member for Wanguri in the Northern Territory Legislative Assembly from 1983 to 1989, when he resigned due to ill health.

|}

He was a minister in the Tuxworth and Hatton governments, serving variously as Minister for Community Development (1986–1987), Minister for Correctional Services (1986–1987), Minister for Youth, Sport, Recreation and Ethnic Affairs (1986–1987) and Minister for Health and Community Services (1987–1989).

References

1944 births
1990 deaths
Members of the Northern Territory Legislative Assembly
Country Liberal Party members of the Northern Territory Legislative Assembly
20th-century Australian politicians